The following is a list of universities and colleges in Fujian Province, People's Republic of China and Fuchien Province, Republic of China.

People's Republic of China

National
Huaqiao University (Quanzhou)
Xiamen University (founded 1921)  Ω

Provincial
Jimei University (Xiamen)
Xiamen University of Technology
Longyan University
Minnan Normal University (Zhangzhou)
Putian University
Quanzhou Normal University
Sanming University
Wuyi University (Nanping)

Fuzhou
Fujian Agriculture and Forestry University (Fuzhou)
Fujian University of Traditional Chinese Medicine (Fuzhou)
Minjiang University (Fuzhou)
Fujian Medical University (Fuzhou)
Fujian Normal University (founded 1907) (Fuzhou)
Fujian University of Technology (Fuzhou)
Fuzhou University  Ω

Private
Yang-en University (Quanzhou)

Republic of China

Kinmen
National Quemoy University

References

External links
List of Chinese Higher Education Institutions — Ministry of Education
List of Chinese universities, including official links
Fujian Institutions Admitting International Students

 
Fujian